LSG is an R&B supergroup, composed of R&B artists Gerald Levert from Cleveland, Ohio, Keith Sweat from Harlem, New York and Johnny Gill from Washington, D.C. The group's name "LSG" is derived from the first letter in the last name of each artist (Levert, Sweat, Gill).

In 1997, LSG released their debut album titled Levert.Sweat.Gill. With the chart-topping lead single "My Body", the album was quickly certified platinum.

LSG released a follow-up final album in 2003 titled LSG2.

Johnny Gill announced on the September 12, 2013 episode of The Arsenio Hall Show that Eddie Levert, Gerald's father, will replace him as the "L" in LSG. Gerald Levert died in 2006.

History
This project began when Keith Sweat called Gerald Levert and told him about an idea to record with Johnny Gill. For their 1997 debut album, they collaborated with popular producers and guest appearances including Sean Combs, Jermaine Dupri, LL Cool J, MC Lyte, and Busta Rhymes.

Discography

Studio albums

Singles

See also
Gerald Levert
Keith Sweat
Johnny Gill

References

African-American musical groups
American soul musical groups
American contemporary R&B musical groups
Contemporary R&B supergroups
Musical groups established in 1997